The Portal State Bank on Main St. in Portal, North Dakota, United States, was built in 1903 in Classical Revival architecture.  Also known as the Union Bank of Portal, it was listed on the National Register of Historic Places in 1996.

It was very well built and is well preserved, and is unusual in Burke County for its architecture.

References

Bank buildings on the National Register of Historic Places in North Dakota
Commercial buildings completed in 1903
Neoclassical architecture in North Dakota
National Register of Historic Places in Burke County, North Dakota
1903 establishments in North Dakota